The Girl Who Cried Wolf may refer to:

'The Girl Who Cried Wolf', a season 8 episode of Beverly Hills, 90210
'The Girl Who Cried Wolf', an episode of Men in Trees
Girl Who Cried Wolf, 2009 album by Sierra Swan
'The Girl Who Cried Wolf', a song by 5 seconds of summer

See also
The Boy Who Cried Wolf